Jérémy Desplanches (born 7 August 1994) is a Swiss breaststroke and medley swimmer.

He competed at the 2015 World Aquatics Championships, at the 2016 Summer Olympics in Rio de Janeiro and was finalist at the 2017 World Aquatics Championships.

He won the men's 200m Individual Medley final at the Glasgow 2018 European Swimming Championships in Glasgow and got silver in men's 200m individual medley at the 18th FINA World Championships in Gwangju. He's the second male swimmer from Switzerland to claim a medal at the FINA World Championships, after Dano Halsall in the men's 50m freestyle in 1986.

He represented Switzerland at the 2020 Summer Olympics and won a bronze medal in the men's 200m individual medley.

International Swimming League 
In 2019 Desplanches was member of the 2019 International Swimming League representing Team Iron.

References

External links

1994 births
Living people
Swiss male breaststroke swimmers
Olympic swimmers of Switzerland
Swimmers at the 2016 Summer Olympics
Swimmers at the 2020 Summer Olympics
Medalists at the 2020 Summer Olympics
Olympic bronze medalists in swimming
Olympic bronze medalists for Switzerland
Swiss male medley swimmers
European Aquatics Championships medalists in swimming
World Aquatics Championships medalists in swimming
Sportspeople from Geneva
21st-century Swiss people